Vyacheslav Grigorevich Domani (born 2 May 1947) is a Russian former volleyball player who competed for the Soviet Union in the 1972 Summer Olympics.

In 1972, he was part of the Soviet team which won the bronze medal in the Olympic tournament. He played all seven matches.

Personal life
His son Dmitri Domani played basketball professionally.

References

External links
 
 

1947 births
Living people
Russian men's volleyball players
Soviet men's volleyball players
Olympic volleyball players of the Soviet Union
Volleyball players at the 1972 Summer Olympics
Olympic bronze medalists for the Soviet Union
Olympic medalists in volleyball
Medalists at the 1972 Summer Olympics